The 1995 Giro del Trentino was the 19th edition of the Tour of the Alps cycle race and was held on 27 April to 29 April 1995. The race started in Riva del Garda and finished in Arco. The race was won by Heinz Imboden.

General classification

References

1995
1995 in road cycling
1995 in Italian sport